Earby railway station was a junction station that served the town of Earby, which was in the West Riding of Yorkshire, England, at the time but now is in Lancashire. It was built by the Midland Railway, on the former Leeds and Bradford Extension Railway between Skipton and Colne and opened in 1848.

The main line continued towards  to the north. The latter route succumbed to the Beeching Axe in September 1965, but the station remained open until 2 February 1970, when passenger trains between Colne and Skipton were withdrawn and the line closed to all traffic.

The track through the station was lifted the following year, but the platforms and main buildings survived until final demolition in late 1976.  The goods shed and former weighbridge still stand, having been bought by a local engineering company and adapted for commercial use whilst the site and former railway alignment have been protected from potential redevelopment by Lancashire County Council pending possible future reinstatement of the route as a transport corridor.

References

External links

 Disused Stations - Earby

Buildings and structures demolished in 1976
Disused railway stations in the Borough of Pendle
Former Midland Railway stations
Railway stations in Great Britain opened in 1848
Railway stations in Great Britain closed in 1970
1848 establishments in England
1970 disestablishments in England